Two Blondes is a short story from Charlaine Harris's series The Southern Vampire Mysteries, released on August 3, 2010. This short story is featured in Death's Excellent Vacation

Plot summary
Sookie and Pam go to Tunica, Mississippi for what Sookie had hoped to be a simple vacation sightseeing and gambling but is unsurprised that the duo also has to perform an errand at the request of Victor. After enjoying a day around town by herself and a strongman competition with Pam, Sookie finds out that they need to see if Michael, a vampire owner of the strip club Blonde, would defect to serve Castro, the vampire king in charge of Sookie and Pam's area. The two arrive at the strip club and meet with Michael and his half-elf assistant Rudy, but Pam is poisoned when Rudy puts some of his blood into her drink - the effect similar to tranquilizer or strong liquor. Michael had hoped to get Eric to pay ransom for the two but the attempt failed as Pam was still able to resist. Pam incapacitated Michael while Sookie took out Rudy with a revolver she had received from Pam earlier. In an attempt to escape from the club the two pretend to be strippers trying out for the club. Police arrive responding to a call that Michael and Rudy had been murdered and question Pam and Sookie but eventually let them go and the two return to Bon Temps.

Characters

Main characters
Sookie Stackhouse: Human, telepath and barmaid of a local bar 'Merlottes'.
Pam Ravenscroft: Vampire, co-owner of a bar called 'Fangtasia', progeny of Eric Northman.      (Pamela Swynford De Beauford as listed for the True Blood series).

Non-recurring characters
Michael: Vampire and owner of 'Blonde,' a strip club in Tunica, Mississippi. The target of Pam and Sookie's errand.
Rudy: Half elf - half human assistant to Michael.

References 

2010 short stories
Fantasy short stories
Vampires in written fiction
The Southern Vampire Mysteries
Mississippi in fiction
Ace Books books